Izabela Daniela Lăcătuş (born 2 October 1976 in Bucharest, Romania) is a retired Romanian artistic and aerobic gymnast. She was an alternate to the artistic gymnastics team at the 1992 Olympics. After retiring from artistic gymnastics she had a career in aerobic gymnastics, winning 16 world and continental medals including the 2000 individual world title.

Artistic gymnastics career
Lăcătuş started gymnastics at the CSS Triumf club in her hometown Bucharest, but later she moved to Deva where she trained with the national team. She progressed rapidly and in 1989 she moved up to the senior team and trained alongside Daniela Silivaş. In 1990, following the Revolution, the gym at Deva closed and Lăcătuş went to train at the Olympic Center in Oneşti. Although still a junior according to the FIG rules, she participated in 1990 at competitions reserved for seniors as well as in junior meets. By the end of 1990 the gym at Deva opened again and the national team was reinstated. Izabela missed the 1991 Romanian International due to an injury but she competed in the Junior European Championships where she placed 4th all around. Latter that year she won silver for the all around at the Cottbus Cup. In 1992 she won silver on bars at the Romanian International and earned herself a place as the second alternate to the 1992 Romanian Olympic team. The other members of the team were Cristina Bontas, Lavinia Miloşovici, Gina Gogean, Mirela Paşca, Maria Neculiţă and Vanda Hădărean. Eugenia Popa was the first alternate. In 1992 Izabela competed at several competitions but an ankle injury sidelined her for the rest of the year. She did not manage to make a full recovery and retired in 1994.

Post-1994 and aerobic gymnastics career
In 1994 she started to train for aerobic gymnastics at CSS Triumf Club with coach Maria Fumea and to coach the lower level gymnasts at the same club. She enrolled at the Sports University in Bucharest, with the hope of becoming a coach after graduation. Izabela also performed in the Aeros entertainment show. Among her colleagues at Aeros were Daniela Mărănducă, Lacramioara Filip, Cristian Leric and Remus Nicolai. Her debut as an aerobic gymnast in an international event was at the  1st World Aerobic Gymnastics Championships in Paris, 1995. During her aerobic gymnastics career she competed in the individual event, mixed pairs and groups. Her partners in the mixed pair event were Claudiu Varlam (until 1999) and Remus Nicolai (after 1999). On the individual event she won four world championship medals (gold 2000, silver 1999, 2002 and bronze 1998) and four European championship medals (gold 2001, 2005 and silver 1999, 2003).  She also placed 5th on the individual event at the 2004 world championships. On the mixed pairs event she won one silver and three bronze medals at world championships (2000, 1998, 2002, 2004) and three continental medals  (gold 2003, silver 2001 and bronze 1999).  She also placed seventh on mixed pairs at the 1997 world championships. On the group event she won the continental title in 2005 and placed fourth at the 2006 world championships.

Post-retirement
Lăcătuş retired after the 2006 world championships. She is currently coaching aerobic gymnastics at the CSS Triumf club in Bucharest.

References

1976 births
Living people
Gymnasts from Bucharest
Romanian female artistic gymnasts
Romanian aerobic gymnasts
Female aerobic gymnasts
European champions in gymnastics
World Games gold medalists
World Games silver medalists
World Games bronze medalists
Competitors at the 2001 World Games
Competitors at the 2005 World Games
Medalists at the Aerobic Gymnastics World Championships